Edward Lowry Henderson (1873 – 26 September 1947) was a priest in the Church of England and the Scottish Episcopal Church.

Born in 1873 and educated at Radley and Oriel College, Oxford, he was ordained in 1899. His first post was as a Curate of St Anne's Limehouse, after which he was Rector of St Margaret's Church, Lowestoft and then a Residentiary Canon at Gloucester Cathedral. In 1919, he was appointed Provost of St Mary's Cathedral, Edinburgh. In 1925, he became Dean of St Albans and a decade later of Salisbury. He retired in 1943, becoming Dean Emeritus and died on 26 September 1947.

His son Edward was Bishop of Bath and Wells from 1960 to 1975.

References

1873 births
People educated at Radley College
Alumni of Oriel College, Oxford
Provosts of St Mary's Cathedral, Edinburgh (Episcopal)
Deans of St Albans
Deans of Salisbury
1947 deaths